(Albanian; or ) is a village located in northeastern Kosovo, in the municipality of Podujevo.

Demographics 
The settlement in Dumosh is divided into several "mahalla" (quarters), such as Podvorica, Kutleshi, Maqastena, Visoka etc. The village has a total of 1207 inhabitants.

Infrastructure
The village of Dumosh has a following infrastructure:
 Airport (Batlava-Donja Penduha Airfield)
 Elementary school (Shkolla fillore Musli Dumoshi) 
 2 grocery stores
 Mosque (Xhamia e Dumoshit)
 Cemetery
 Internet Cafè
 Barber shop
 Bicycle service
 Metalwarehouse
 Soccer (football) field

Batlava Airport
Batlava Airport or Batlava-Donja Penduha Airfield, a Kosovo airport, is a former military airport in the village of Dumosh, near Lake Batlava and the towns of Batlava and Podujevo.

In 1936, Aeroput used the airport on the Belgrade-Podujevo-Skopje line using the Aeroput MMS-3 plane. The airport was later rebuilt for military use by the Yugoslav army and air force. It was damaged in 1999 during the NATO bombing of the Federal Republic of Yugoslavia.

Notable people
Xhavit Bajrami, former Albanian-Swiss K1 kickboxer world champion 
Besnik Podvorica, Basketball player, Kosovo national basketball team and Sigal Prishtina
Besnik Kutleshi, president and senior squad member of North Sunshine Eagles FC
Arif Kutleshi, writer and poet

The tea of "qaj rusi"
The most common drink in Podujevo is the tea of "qaj rusi" (the Russian tea) or even "qaj i zi" (the black tea), made from tea produced in either India or Sri Lanka. This kind of tea is said to have been first served in the village of Dumosh.

Notes

References

Villages in Podujevo